Goldisc Records was an independent record label, formed in New York City in 1960 by producer George Goldner.

Among the artists that enjoyed brief successful tenures in the company included a New York vocal group that called themselves the Temptations that released their recordings a year before Motown's Temptations; Ivory Joe Hunter and Little Richard, who recorded some of his gospel recordings for the label. All the Goldisc releases were distributed nationally by End Records, a company Goldner worked for.

After success in the early 1960s, the label went dormant after 1964 and struggled financially until the Timeless Entertainment company acquired its assets in 1978. Afterwards, Goldisc became a label that reissued hundreds of 1950s and 1960s vinyl discs.

American independent record labels
Vanity record labels
Rhythm and blues record labels